Galerita is a genus of beetles in the family Carabidae, containing the following species:

 Galerita aenigmatica Reichardt, 1971 
 Galerita aequinoctialis Chaudoir, 1852  
 Galerita aethiopica (Basilewsky, 1984) 
 Galerita affinis Dejean, 1831 
 Galerita africana Dejean, 1825 
 Galerita amazonica Liebke, 1939
 Galerita americana (Linnaeus, 1758) 
 Galerita amethystina Reichardt, 1967 
 Galerita angustipennis Gerstaecker, 1867 
 Galerita aptinoides (Basilewsky, 1963) 
 Galerita atripes Leconte, 1858 
 Galerita attelaboides (Fabricius, 1781) 
 Galerita attenuata Quedenfeldt, 1883 
 Galerita azteca Reichardt, 1967 
 Galerita balli Reichardt, 1976 
 Galerita batesi Andrewes, 1923 
 Galerita beauvoisii Chaudoir, 1861 
 Galerita bicolor (Drury, 1773) 
 Galerita boliviana Reichardt, 1967 
 Galerita boucardii Chaudoir, 1869 
 Galerita brachinoides Perty, 1830 
 Galerita brasiliensis Dejean, 1826 
 Galerita bruchi Liebke, 1932 
 Galerita carbonaria Mannerheim, 1837 
 Galerita carinifrons L.Schaufuss, 1887 
 Galerita championi Bates, 1884 
 Galerita coeruleipennis Chaudoir, 1861 
 Galerita collaris Dejean, 1826 
 Galerita convexipennis Reichardt, 1967 
 Galerita corumbana Liebke, 1932 
 Galerita costalimai Reichardt, 1967 
 Galerita costulata Liebke, 1939 
 Galerita esmeraldina Reichardt, 1967 
 Galerita feae Bates, 1892 
 Galerita femoralis Murray, 1857 
 Galerita forreri Bates, 1883 
 Galerita gracilis Brulle, 1837 
 Galerita hexagonica Liebke, 1939 
 Galerita immitis Liebke, 1937 
 Galerita inca Reichardt, 1967 
 Galerita indica Chaudoir, 1861 
 Galerita interstitialis Dejean, 1831 
 Galerita inversa (Basilewsky, 1963) 
 Galerita isthmica Reichardt, 1967 
 Galerita janus (Fabricius, 1792) 
 Galerita javana Jedlicka, 1965 
 Galerita jelskii Chaudoir, 1877 
 Galerita lacordairei Dejean, 1826 
 Galerita laevithorax Reichardt, 1967 
 Galerita lecontei Dejean, 1831 
 Galerita loeffleri Jedlicka, 1966 
 Galerita lunai (Basilewsky, 1963) 
 Galerita madecassa Fairmaire, 1880 
 Galerita marginicollis Laporte De Castelnau, 1834 
 Galerita melanarthra Chaudoir, 1869 
 Galerita mexicana Chaudoir, 1872 
 Galerita microcostata Darlington, 1934 
 Galerita moritzi Mannerheim, 1837 
 Galerita mustelina Bates, 1884 
 Galerita nana Reichardt, 1967 
 Galerita nigra Chevrolat, 1835 
 Galerita occidentalis (Olivier, 1795) 
 Galerita orbignyi Brulle, 1837 
 Galerita orientalis Schmidt-Goebel, 1846 
 Galerita orobia Reichardt, 1967 
 Galerita palustris Liebke, 1939 
 Galerita perrieri (Fairmaire, 1901) 
 Galerita pheropsophoides (Jeannel, 1949) 
 Galerita procera Gerstaecker, 1867 
 Galerita pseudoventricosa Reichardt, 1967 
 Galerita reichardti Ball & Nimmo, 1983
 Galerita rubens Bates, 1888 
 Galerita rubripes (Jeannel, 1949) 
 Galerita ruficeps Chaudoir, 1861 
 Galerita ruficollis Dejean, 1825 
 Galerita seminigra Chaudoir, In Oberthur, 1883 
 Galerita simplex Chaudoir, 1852 
 Galerita simplicicarinata Reichardt, 1967 
 Galerita stenodera Chaudoir, 1854 
 Galerita strandi Liebke, 1939  
 Galerita striata Klug, 1834 
 Galerita sulcipennis Reichardt, 1967 
 Galerita toreuta Andrewes, 1933 
 Galerita tremolerasi Liebke, 1939 
 Galerita tristis Reiche, 1842 
 Galerita tucumana Liebke, 1932 
 Galerita unicolor Latreille & Dejean, 1823 
 Galerita ventricosa Lucas, 1857

References
 
Hunting W. (2008) Female reproductive system of the tribe Galeritini (Coleoptera: Carabidae): structural features and evolution. Annals of Carnegie Museum 77 (1): 229-242 doi: 10.2992/0097-4463-77.1.229.

Dryptinae